Thung Pradu railway station is a railway station located in Thap Sakae Subdistrict, Thap Sakae District, Prachuap Khiri Khan.

Due to minimal passenger usage, Thung Pradu is being converted railway halt and will officially be in operation when the double tracking of the line section is completed.

Train services 
 Ordinary 254/255 Lang Suan-Thon Buri-Lang Suan

References 
 
 

Railway stations in Thailand